Parmotrema aurantiacoparvum is a species of corticolous lichen in the family Parmeliaceae. Found in South America, it was described as new to science in 1992 by lichenologist Harrie Sipman. The lichen has been collected in Colombia, Guyana, French Guiana, Venezuela, and Brazil. It grows on canopy branches and on small trees in well-lit areas of forests or clearings.

See also
List of Parmotrema species

References

aurantiacoparvum
Lichen species
Lichens described in 1992
Lichens of South America
Taxa named by Harrie Sipman